The Strawberry Islands are a small chain of four islands located on the Wisconsin side of Green Bay between Chambers Island and Peninsula State Park. The islands are part of the Town of Gibraltar, Wisconsin.

The islands were likely occupied for thousands of years by indigenous peoples. Gradually the historic Ojibwe people moved into the area around the Great Lakes, where they competed with the existing Sioux (Lakota). They pushed the Sioux west into the Great Plains, with their last battle occurring in 1745.

The islands and the adjacent Strawberry Channel were part of a border dispute between Wisconsin and Michigan that was eventually resolved in the 1926 United States Supreme Court case Michigan v. Wisconsin.

The northernmost island of the chain is Pirate Island, which at high water levels is little more than a reef awash. The next island to the south is Jack Island, and the next to the south is Little Strawberry Island. The largest island at the very southern tip of the chain is named Adventure Island. Today, all but Pirate Island are privately owned.

Climate

Gallery

References

External links
 Adventure Island, Web-Map of Door County, Wisconsin
 Little Strawberry Island, Web-Map of Door County, Wisconsin
 Jack Island, Web-Map of Door County, Wisconsin
 Pirate Island, Web-Map of Door County, Wisconsin

Lake islands of Wisconsin
Islands of Door County, Wisconsin
Islands of Lake Michigan in Wisconsin
Private islands of Wisconsin
Private islands of the Great Lakes